Auk-Bulyak (Awıq-Büläk) is a rural locality (a village) in Badryashevsky Selsoviet, Tatyshlinsky District, Bashkortostan, Russia. The population was 113 as of 2010. There are 3 streets.

Geography 
Auk-Bulyak is located 9 km north of Verkhniye Tatyshly (the district's administrative centre) by road. Badryashevo is the nearest rural locality.

References 

Rural localities in Tatyshlinsky District